Notable Slovak football transfers in the summer transfer window 2016 by club. Only transfers of the Fortuna Liga and DOXXbet liga are included.

Fortuna Liga

FK AS Trenčín

In:

Out:

ŠK Slovan Bratislava

In:

 

Out:

Spartak Myjava

In:

Out:

FC Spartak Trnava

In:

 

Out:

MŠK Žilina

In:

Out:

MFK Ružomberok

In:

Out:

FC DAC 1904 Dunajská Streda

In:

Out:

FO ŽP Šport Podbrezová

In:

Out:

FC ViOn Zlaté Moravce

In:

Out:

FK Senica

In:

 

 
 
 

Out:

MFK Zemplín Michalovce

In:

Out:

1. FC Tatran Prešov

In:

Out:

DOXXbet liga

MFK Skalica

In:

Out:

FC ŠTK 1914 Šamorín

In:

Out:

FC VSS Košice

In:

Out:

Partizán Bardejov

In:

Out:

FC Lokomotíva Košice

In:

Out:

FC Nitra

In:

Out:

FK Poprad

In:

Out:

MŠK Rimavská Sobota

In:

Out:

FK Dukla Banská Bystrica

In:

Out:

References

Transfers
Slovakia
2016